Mage is a 1980 rulebook for the Archaeron Game System.

Contents
Mage is intended to supplement an existing fantasy campaign, or be used separately as rules for magical combat.

Reception
Lloyd W. Willis reviewed Mage in The Space Gamer No. 37. Willis commented that "The main problem with Mage is that it requires a thorough and imaginative referee. Since such referees are always in short supply, using Mage in your campaign is likely to be quite disappointing. On the other hand, if you use it for the one-on-one magical combat, it promises all the excitement of the last Duran-Leonard fight."

Reviews
Different Worlds #28 (April, 1983)
Pegasus #2 (1981)

References

Fantasy role-playing game supplements
Role-playing game supplements introduced in 1980